RBR may refer to:
 Red Bull Racing, a Formula One motor racing team
 Red Bank Regional High School, a regional high school (often called RBR) in Little Silver, New Jersey
 Richard Burns Rally, a video game
 Rietumu Banka - Riga, cycling team
 Righteous Babe Records, the recording label of singer-songwriter Ani DiFranco
 Rio Branco International Airport, in Brazil
 RBR-120 mm M90, a portable anti-tank rocket launcher
 Royal Berkshire Regiment, an infantry regiment in the British Army from 1881 to 1959
 Royal Bermuda Regiment, a local defence infantry regiment of the British Army